Bartkūniškis Manor is a former residential manor in Barkūniškis village, Kėdainiai district.

References

Manor houses in Lithuania